Exner syndrome, also known as serpentine fibula polycystic kidney syndrome, is a rare disorder, typified by the afflicted person having oddly formed, s-shaped fibulas as well as the development of numerous cysts in the kidneys.

Symptoms and signs

All of the following are usual elements of the syndrome:
 Short stature
 Abnormal calf bone shape (fibula)
 Unusual facial appearance
 Polycystic kidneys
 Abnormally long fibula
 Mild sunken chest
 Large corneas
 Inguinal hernia
 Umbilical hernia

Diagnosis

Exner syndrome is sometimes misdiagnosed as interstitial cystitis in its very early stages, but once the fibula begins to malform, Exner is the only real diagnosis.

Treatment

History

The syndrome was discovered in June, 1988 by Dr. G. Exner, a researcher at Orthopädische Universitätsklinik Balgrist in Zurich, Switzerland. Exner officially named the disorder serpentine fibula polycystic kidney syndrome, but the term "Exner syndrome" became more prevalent. While some research links it to other, related disorders, most research suggests that Exner syndrome is very distinct.

References

External links 

Syndromes
Kidney diseases
Genetic disorders with OMIM but no gene